Saint-Joseph is a commune in the Arrondissement of Fort-de-France on Martinique.

Geography

Climate
Saint-Joseph has a tropical monsoon climate (Köppen climate classification Am).

Population

See also
Communes of the Martinique department

References

Communes of Martinique
Populated places in Martinique